Nebi Safa, Nabi Safa, Neby Sufa, An Nabi Safa, An Nabi Safa' or En Nabi Safa also known as Mazraet Selsata or Thelthatha is a village in the Kfar Mishki municipality situated  west of Rashaya in the Rashaya District of the Beqaa Governorate in Lebanon.

The village is situated in a gap in a ridge overlooking the Wadi Al-Taym between the Merj Shemiseh and is predominantly occupied by Druze. It was visited by Edward Robinson in 1852, who noted two sarcophagi (roman temples) in the area.

Roman temple
There are the ruins of a Roman temple in the village that is included in a group of Temples of Mount Hermon. It faces east with a commanding aspect towards Mount Hermon. It was noted that the view "of Hermon from this point is imposing beyond the power of language to express". George Taylor noted that the doorway of the temple was at least thirty degrees offset from the peak. It feature an elegant pediment with graceful architecture. Only the northern wall remains standing with pilasters in the northeast corner. At the west end of the temple is an altar with stairs leading down to an underground chamber or crypt that runs for the length of the temple.

The site was suggested to have been used by the Druze as a shrine to a prophet called Safa, who was descended from Jacob and whose people lived towards Hebron and Jerusalem. Little record of the prophet Safa remains, although it was said that "The honourable body is there, and the spirit is always to be found there. Any day that a man seeks him he will find him, it depends on his faith."

References

Bibliography

  (p. 491 ff)

External links
Nebi Safa on sattelliteviews.net
Nebi Safa on middleeast.com
Nebi Safa on geographic.org
Roman Temples on discoverlebanon.com
Hiking to Kfar Mechki on lebivity.com
3D Google Earth map of En Nebi Safa on www.gmap3d.com
Nabi Safa (Mazraet Selsata) on wikimapia
Nabi Safa on www.localiban.org
Full text of Picturesque Palestine, Sinai and Egypt. Edited by Charles Wilson, 1881.

Populated places in Rashaya District
Archaeological sites in Lebanon
Ancient Roman temples
Roman sites in Lebanon
Tourist attractions in Lebanon